Gastrocopta pellucida is a species of minute air-breathing land snail, a terrestrial pulmonate gastropod mollusk or micromollusk in the family Vertiginidae, the vertigo snails.

Subspecies 
Subspecies within this species include:
 Gastrocopta pellucida hordeacella (Pilsbry)
 Gastrocopta pellucida parvidens (MacMillan, 1946) - slim snaggletooth

References

Vertiginidae
Gastropods described in 1840